Gary Hamson (born 24 August 1959) is an English former footballer. A midfielder, he scored 15 goals in 292 league appearances in a 12-year career in the Football League with Sheffield United, Leeds United, Bristol City, and Port Vale. He retired as a player in March 1988, and after a brief spell coaching at Port Vale he took up work as a financial adviser.

Career
Hamson had trials with Derby County and played for Ilkeston Town, before he joined Sheffield United, turning professional in November 1976. United finished the 1976–77 season in 11th place in the Second Division under the stewardship of Jimmy Sirrel. The "Blades" then ended the 1977–78 campaign in 12th place under new boss Harry Haslam, before suffering relegation in 1978–79. In league and cup competitions, Hamson scored a total of nine goals in 124 appearances during his three years at Bramall Lane. He was sold on to Jimmy Adamson's Leeds United for a £140,000 fee in July 1979. He played 19 First Division games in the 1979–80 season, and played 14 games in the 1980–81 campaign under Allan Clarke's stewardship; his appearances in the latter campaign were restricted due to a nine match ban he picked up for picking up too many yellow cards. He claimed three goals in 21 games in the 1981–82 season as the "Whites" dropped into the Second Division; he also picked up an injury against West Bromwich Albion that seriously affected his career at Elland Road. He was forced to sit out the entirety of the 1982–83 season, save for one appearance in the FA Cup. He returned to manager Eddie Gray's first team plans and posted 28 appearances in the 1983–84 season and 32 appearances in the 1984–85 season, and then played 34 matches for new boss Billy Bremner in the 1985–86 campaign.

Hamson moved on to Bristol City in July 1986, with "Robins" manager Terry Cooper picking him up on a free transfer. He scored one goal in 12 Third Division games before losing his first team place at Ashton Gate halfway through the 1986–87 season. He was bought by Port Vale manager John Rudge for a £5,000 fee in December 1986. He was a regular feature on the left side of the Vale midfield, making 27 Third Division appearances in the 1986–87 season and scoring one goal in a 4–2 win over Doncaster Rovers at Vale Park on 3 February. He claimed three goals in 18 league and cup games in the 1987–88 season, but was forced to retire in March 1988 due to an ankle injury.

Personal life
After retiring as a player, Hamson was appointed as youth coach at Port Vale. He quit this post in July 1989 to become a builder. He later served on the Erewash Borough Council as a Liberal Democrat; Hamson is now a co-owner of a financial advisers in Derbyshire and also the agent of winger Aiden McGeady. He became an independent financial advisor for Hallmark-ifa in 2000. He has a wife and four sons.

Career statistics
Source:

A.  The "Other" column constitutes appearances and goals in the League Cup, Football League Trophy, Football League play-offs and Full Members Cup.

References

1959 births
Living people
Footballers from Nottingham
English footballers
Association football midfielders
Ilkeston Town F.C. players
Sheffield United F.C. players
Leeds United F.C. players
Bristol City F.C. players
Port Vale F.C. players
English Football League players
Association football coaches
Port Vale F.C. non-playing staff
Financial advisors